{| style="margin:5px; border:1px solid #177245;" align=right cellpadding=3 cellspacing=3 width=400
|- align="center" bgcolor=#4169E1
|colspan=2| Northern Areas Football Association
|- align="center" bgcolor="#eeeeee"
|| Established || 1909
|- align="center"
|| Teams || 6
|- align="center" bgcolor="#eeeeee"
|| 2022 Premiers || BROUGHTON MUNDOORA FC
|- align="center"
|| Most premierships || 23 - Crystal Brook
|- align="center" bgcolor="#eeeeee"
|| 2022Leading goalkicker || Sam Dyer (Broughton-Mundoora)

|}

The Northern Areas Football Association''' is an Australian rules football competition based in the Mid North region of South Australia, Australia.  It is an affiliated member of the South Australian National Football League.

In 2007 Orroroo Football Club were premiers, defeating Broughton-Mundoora Football Club.

Current clubs 

In 2008, Crystal Brook were Premiers after a 16-year premiership drought, winning the Grand Final at Crystal Brook defeating Southern Flinders.

Brief history 
The Northern Areas FA was formed in 1909 with founding clubs including Crystal Brook, Gladstone, Jamestown, Orroroo and Laura.

Premierships

 1909 JAMESTOWN FC
 1910 CRYSTAL BROOK FC
 1911 CRYSTAL BROOK FC
 1912 NO COMPETITION
 1913 GLADSTONE FC
 1914 LAURA FC
 1915 LAURA FC
 1919 JAMESTOWN FC
 1920 JAMESTOWN FC
 1921 LAURA FC
 1922 JAMESTOWN FC
 1923 CRYSTAL BROOK FC
 1924 GLADSTONE FC
 1925 LAURA FC
 1926 GEORGETOWN FC
 1927 JAMESTOWN FC
 1928 GLADSTONE FC
 1929 GLADSTONE FC
 1930 GLADSTONE FC
 1931 JAMESTOWN FC
 1932 JAMESTOWN FC
 1933 GEORGETOWN FC
 1934 GEORGETOWN FC
 1935 GEORGETOWN FC
 1936 JAMESTOWN FC
 1937 GEORGETOWN FC
 1938 GEORGETOWN FC
 1939 CRYSTAL BROOK FC
 1940 GEORGETOWN FC
 1941 GEORGETOWN FC
 1946 GEORGETOWN FC
 1947 GEORGETOWN FC
 1948 GEORGETOWN FC
 1949 GEORGETOWN FC
 1950 GLADSTONE FC
 1951 CRYSTAL BROOK FC
 1952 GEORGETOWN FC
 1953 LAURA FC
 1954 CRYSTAL BROOK FC
 1955 GLADSTONE FC
 1956 GLADSTONE FC
 1957 GLADSTONE FC
 1958 JAMESTOWN FC
 1959 JAMESTOWN FC
 1960 CRYSTAL BROOK FC
 1961 JAMESTOWN FC
 1962 CRYSTAL BROOK FC
 1963 CRYSTAL BROOK FC
 1964 CRYSTAL BROOK FC
 1965 PETERBOROUGH FC
 1966 PETERBOROUGH FC
 1967 CRYSTAL BROOK FC
 1968 JAMESTOWN FC
 1969 GEORGETOWN CALTOWIE FC
 1970 GLADSTONE FC
 1971 CRYSTAL BROOK FC
 1972 PETERBOROUGH FC
 1973 GLADSTONE COMBINE FC
 1974 GLADSTONE COMBINE FC
 1975 CRYSTAL BROOK FC
 1976 ORROROO FC
 1977 ORROROO FC
 1978 ORROROO FC
 1979 PETERBOROUGH FC
 1980 CRYSTAL BROOK FC
 1981 CRYSTAL BROOK FC
 1982 ORROROO FC
 1983 JAMESTOWN APPILA FC
 1984 JAMESTOWN APPILA FC
 1985 BROUGHTON MUNDOORA FC
 1986 BROUGHTON MUNDOORA FC
 1987 ORROROO FC
 1988 JAMESTOWN APPILA FC
 1989 JAMESTOWN APPILA FC
 1990 JAMESTOWN APPILA FC
 1991 JAMESTOWN APPILA FC
 1992 CRYSTAL BROOK FC
 1993 BROUGHTON MUNDOORA FC
 1994 ORROROO FC
 1995 ORROROO FC
 1996 BROUGHTON MUNDOORA FC
 1997 BROUGHTON MUNDOORA FC
 1998 ORROROO FC
 1999 ORROROO FC
 2000 BROUGHTON MUNDOORA FC
 2001 BOOLOROO CENTRE/MELROSE/WILMINGTON FC
 2002 ORROROO FC
 2003 JAMESTOWN/PETERBOROUGH FC
 2004 JAMESTOWN/PETERBOROUGH FC
 2005 BOOLOROO CENTRE/MELROSE/WILMINGTON FC
 2006 BROUGHTON MUNDOORA FC
 2007 ORROROO FC
 2008 CRYSTAL BROOK FC
 2009 SOUTHERN FLINDERS FC
 2010 SOUTHERN FLINDERS FC
 2011 CRYSTAL BROOK FC
 2012 CRYSTAL BROOK FC
 2013 SOUTHERN FLINDERS FC
 2014 JAMESTOWN/PETERBOROUGH FC
 2015 CRYSTAL BROOK FC
 2016 BROUGHTON MUNDOORA FC
 2017 CRYSTAL BROOK FC
 2018 CRYSTAL BROOK FC
 2019 BROUGHTON MUNDOORA FC
 2020 BROUGHTON MUNDOORA FC
 2021 ORROROO Fc
 2022 BROUGHTON MUNDOORA FC

2006 Ladder

2007 Ladder

2008 Ladder

2009 Ladder

2010 Ladder

2011 Ladder

2012 Ladder

2013 Ladder

2014 Ladder

2015 Ladder

2016 Ladder

2017 Ladder

References

External links 
 Footypedia - NAFA
 country footy

Books
 Encyclopedia of South Australian country football clubs / compiled by Peter Lines. 
 South Australian country football digest / by Peter Lines 

Australian rules football competitions in South Australia